Baiyun New Town is a new central business district (CBD) in Baiyun District, Guangzhou, China, located around the former Baiyun Airport.

The CBD will be divided into six new communities: Huangshi, Xiaogang, Jichang (Airport), Yunshan, Chuangyi and Keziling. Xiaogang Village in the CBD will be redeveloped. New parks will be built around Baiyun Mountain, including Feixiang Park to the south and Community Park to the west. New buildings will be constructed, including an exhibition centre, the Guangdong Painting Academy, the Guangzhou Museum and the Guangdong Performance Centre.

Transport
For transportation, Guangzhou Metro Line 2 and Line 14 will cut across the CBD.

References

Baiyun District, Guangzhou
Central business districts in China